Farranree is a suburb on the northside of the city of Cork, Ireland. It is bordered by Blackpool, Churchfield and Fairhill. It mainly consists of terraced houses, many of which are owned by Cork City Council. The main schools in Farranree are 
Scoil Aiseiri Chriost, North Presentation Secondary School,
the North Monastery and Scoil Íosagain

The local GAA club is Na Piarsaigh Hurling, Camogie and Football Club.

It has a local Gala Express shop, a butchers and a public park.

Notable residents 
 John Gardiner, Na Piarsaigh and Cork senior hurler and All Ireland winner
 Seán Óg Ó hAilpín, Na Piarsaigh and Cork senior hurler; footballer and All Ireland winning captain
 Mae Agnes "Maisie" Kelly Gleason was born at Farranree; mother of Jackie Gleason
Fiona Shaw, actress, born at Farranree
John O’Shea professional darts player, BDO World Masters winner

References 

Geography of Cork (city)